The 2022–23 Ford Trophy is the ongoing 52nd season of The Ford Trophy, the List A cricket tournament that is played in New Zealand. It is the twelfth in a sponsorship deal between New Zealand Cricket and Ford Motor Company. The tournament is scheduled to run from November 2022 to February 2023. In August 2022, New Zealand Cricket announced schedule of 2022-23 domestic season. Auckland were the defending champions.

Points table

 Advances to Grand Final
 Advance to Elimination Final

Fixtures

Finals

Elimination Final

Grand Final

Notes

References

External links
Series home at ESPN Cricinfo

Ford Trophy
2022–23 New Zealand cricket season
Ford Trophy